The canton of Hennebont is an administrative division of the Morbihan department, northwestern France. Its borders were modified at the French canton reorganisation which came into effect in March 2015. Its seat is in Hennebont.

Composition

It consists of the following communes:
Hennebont
Kervignac
Languidic
Locmiquélic
Port-Louis
Riantec

Councillors

Pictures of the canton

References

Cantons of Morbihan